"Deeper" is the first single released from Boss' debut album, Born Gangstaz. Produced by Def Jef, "Deeper" was the most successful single Boss would release during her short career, becoming a #1 hit on the Hot Rap Singles and was her only single to reach the Billboard Hot 100.

Single track listing

A-side
"Deeper" (Radio Edit)- 3:57  
"Deeper" (Instrumental)- 3:54

B-side
"Deeper" (LP Version)- 3:59  
"Drive By" (Rollin' Slow Remix)- 3:52

Charts

Samples
"Deeper" samples vocals from "I'm Gonna Love You Just a Little More Baby" by Barry White.
"Deeper" contains an interpolation of Under The Bridge by Red Hot Chili Peppers.
"Fire It up" By Da Brat samples Boss's vocals from this song. "Fire It Up" also samples Under The Bridge by Red Hot Chili Peppers.

1993 debut singles
Boss (rapper) songs
Gangsta rap songs
1993 songs
Def Jam Recordings singles